The South American Zone of 2014 FIFA World Cup qualification saw nine teams competing for 4 or 5 berths in the finals.  Brazil automatically qualified for the World Cup as the host nation so were not involved in CONMEBOL qualifying. Argentina, Colombia, Chile, Ecuador and Uruguay advanced to the World Cup.

Format
The format for CONMEBOL's 2014 World Cup qualifying tournament was identical to the previous four editions. All CONMEBOL national teams played against each other twice on a home-and-away basis in a single group for 4 or 5 allotted berths. The top four teams automatically qualified for the finals. The fifth-placed team competed in the intercontinental play-offs against the fifth-placed team from the AFC's World Cup qualifying tournament. The order of matches was identical to that of the 2002, 2006 and 2010 tournaments. As Brazil qualified automatically as hosts, each team had a bye on the date they would normally have been scheduled to play Brazil.

Standings

Matches
The matches were played from 7 October 2011 to 15 October 2013.

Matchday 1

Matchday 2

Matchday 3

Matchday 4

Matchday 5

Matchday 6

Matchday 7

Matchday 8

Matchday 9

Matchday 10

Matchday 11

Matchday 12

Matchday 13

Matchday 14

Matchday 15

Matchday 16

Matchday 17

Matchday 18

Notes

Inter-confederation play-offs

While the top four teams in CONMEBOL qualification tournament qualify for the 2014 World Cup finals in Brazil, the fifth-placed team, Uruguay, played against the fifth-placed team from the Asian Football Confederation (AFC), Jordan, in a home-and-away play-off. The winner of this play-off, Uruguay, qualified for the 2014 FIFA World Cup finals.

The first leg was played on 13 November 2013 in Jordan, and the second leg was played on 20 November 2013.

Qualified teams
The following six teams from CONMEBOL qualified for the final tournament.

1 Bold indicates champions for that year. Italic indicates hosts for that year.

Goalscorers
There were 206 goals scored in 74 games (including inter-confederation play-offs), including two own goals, for an average of 2.78 goals per game.

11 goals

 Luis Suárez

10 goals

 Lionel Messi

9 goals

 Gonzalo Higuaín
 Radamel Falcao

7 goals

 Felipe Caicedo

6 goals

 Teófilo Gutiérrez
 Edinson Cavani

5 goals

 Sergio Agüero
 Eduardo Vargas
 Arturo Vidal
 Jefferson Farfán
 Salomón Rondón

4 goals

 Marcelo Moreno
 Alexis Sánchez
 Christian Benítez

3 goals

 Ángel Di María
 Ezequiel Lavezzi
 Maxi Rodríguez
 Carlos Saucedo
 Matías Fernández
 James Rodríguez
 Segundo Castillo
 Jefferson Montero
 Roque Santa Cruz
 Paolo Guerrero
 Claudio Pizarro
 Cristian Rodríguez
 Juan Arango

2 goals

 Pablo Daniel Escobar
 Charles Aránguiz
 Gary Medel
 Dorlan Pabón
 Mario Yepes
 Édgar Benítez
 Jonathan Fabbro
 Richard Ortiz
 Cristian Riveros
 Carlos Zambrano
 Diego Forlán
 Diego Lugano
 Maxi Pereira
 Cristhian Stuani

1 goal

 Éver Banega
 Rodrigo Palacio
 Jaime Arrascaita
 Diego Bejarano
 Jhasmani Campos
 Rudy Cardozo
 Alejandro Chumacero
 Wálter Flores
 Gualberto Mojica
 Alcides Peña
 Matías Campos
 Pablo Contreras
 Marcos González
 Felipe Gutiérrez
 Esteban Paredes
 Waldo Ponce
 Humberto Suazo
 Pablo Armero
 Fredy Guarín
 Macnelly Torres
 Carlos Valdés
 Juan Camilo Zúñiga
 Jaime Ayoví
 Édison Méndez
 Joao Rojas
 Pablo César Aguilar
 Luis Nery Caballero
 Gustavo Gómez
 José Ariel Núñez
 Jorge Rojas
 Darío Verón
 Paolo Hurtado
 Juan Carlos Mariño
 Yoshimar Yotún
 Sebastián Eguren
 Nicolás Lodeiro
 Fernando Amorebieta
 Frank Feltscher
 César González
 Rómulo Otero
 Luis Manuel Seijas
 Oswaldo Vizcarrondo

1 own goal

 Juan Carlos Paredes (against Chile)
 Diego Godín (against Peru)

References

External links
Results and schedule (FIFA.com version)
Results and schedule (CONMEBOL.com version)

 
Conmebol
FIFA World Cup qualification (CONMEBOL)
World
World
World